Malankara Syrian Orthodox Seminary is a theological seminary for the Jacobite Syrian Christian Church at Mulanthuruthy, Ernakulam in India. Opened in 1990, the seminary buildings are clustered on Udayagiri hill in the village of Vettickal.

See also
Thrikkunnathu Seminary

References

Churches in Ernakulam district